Belén is a town and municipality in Boyacá Department, Colombia. Belen is also part of the Tundama Province a subregion of Boyaca.

Born in Belén 
 Eduardo Grimaldi, Colombian ecologist

External links 
 Belen official website 

Municipalities of Boyacá Department